Anas al-Abdah or Anas Al-Adbah  born 1967) is a Syrian politician who served as President of the Syrian Interim Government from 2019 to 2021.

Early life
Anas al-Abdah was born in a suburb of Damascus. He later studied geology in the Yarmouk University in Jordan and received a master's degree on geophysics at the Newcastle University in England.

Political history
In 2006 Anas al-Abdah and other Syrian opposition activists founded the Movement for Justice and Development in Syria in London. In the same year, he joined the Damascus Declaration and became one of its representatives abroad.

After the start of the Syrian Civil War in 2011, he co-founded the Syrian National Council and was elected as the council's secretariat. The council later joined the National Coalition for Syrian Revolutionary and Opposition Forces. Anas al-Abdah became a part of the SNC's delegate at the Geneva II Conference on Syria.

On 5 March 2016, Anas al-Abdah was elected as the president of the National Coalition, succeeding Khaled Khoja.

On 9 November 2016, the National Coalition under Nas al-Abdah sent congratulations to Donald Trump after the latter was elected as the president of the United States. He also called on Frank-Walter Steinmeier to impose economic sanctions on Russia.

On 5 December 2016, Anas al-Abdah, spoke in a press conference in Erbil, Iraqi Kurdistan, that the Rojava Peshmerga forces based in Iraqi Kurdistan would be a stabilizing factor if they moved to Syria and supported the Free Syrian Army factions backed by the SNC. He said that the offensive the YPG-led Syrian Democratic Forces (SDF) launched last month to retake the city of Raqqa, will lead to sectarian conflicts in the future as YPG and allied groups such as FSA groups are not qualified militarily and civically for retaking Raqqa, only FSA groups supported by the SNC are the qualified force to retake Raqqa. 

He resigned from his post on 6 May 2017 and was replaced by Riad Seif.

On 29 June 2019 he was elected as President of the Syrian Interim Government, replacing Abdurrahman Mustafa, whom he appointed as Prime Minister the following day.

References

1967 births
Living people
National Coalition of Syrian Revolutionary and Opposition Forces members
21st-century Syrian politicians
Yarmouk University alumni
Alumni of Newcastle University
Politicians from Damascus